Events in the year 2019 in Trinidad and Tobago.

Incumbents
 President: Paula-Mae Weekes
 Prime Minister: Keith Rowley
 Chief Justice: Ivor Archie

Events
2 December – 2019 Trinidadian local elections

Deaths

16 May – Dexter St. Louis, table tennis player (b. 1968).
30 May – Jason Marcano, footballer (b. 1983).
15 July – Raymond Choo Kong, actor (b. 1949).
12 September – Linda Baboolal, politician (b. 1941).
3 October – Percy Lewis, Trinidadian-born British Olympic boxer (b. 1928).
9 October – Satnarine Sharma, judge, Chief Justice (b. 1942/1943).
26 October – Clinton Bernard, judge, Chief Justice (b. 1929/1930).
29 October – Mustapha Matura, playwright (b. 1939).
16 November – Satnarayan Maharaj, Hindu religious leader (b. 1931).
19 December – Shahdon Winchester, footballer (b. 1992).

References

 
2010s in Trinidad and Tobago
Years of the 21st century in Trinidad and Tobago
Trinidad and Tobago
Trinidad and Tobago